The Talking Band is an American Off-Off-Broadway theatre company specializing in experimental theatre, based in New York City.

The company consists of a three core artists. Artistic director Paul Zimet; actor, writer and composer Ellen Maddow, and actor and director Tina Shepard. The Talking band has collaborated with numerous performers and artists including: Taylor Mac, Louise Smith, Marcus Gardley, and Lizzie Olesker.

History 
The group was founded in 1974 by Ellen Maddow, Tina Shepard and Paul Zimet. It has roots in the work of The Open Theatre, where Maddow, Shepard and Zimet worked as core company members. The Open Theatre had been founded by director, actor and writer Joseph Chaikin. After Chaikin disbanded The Open Theatre in 1973, Maddow, Shepard and Zimet founded a new theatre company, The Talking Band.

The group is a resident company at La MaMa Experimental Theatre Club, where it has produced and performed many of its plays. The group's first production at La MaMa was Pedro Paramo in 1979.

It has also performed at many of New York City's off-off Broadway theater venues, including, Performance Space 122, Theatre for the New City, Dance Theater Workshop and Dixon Place.

The group has also performed internationally, including The Roundhouse in London, England; The American Center in Paris, France; The Music Gallery in Toronto, Canada; The Kovcheg Theater in Moscow, Russia; Teatro La Batuta in Santiago, Chile; and the National Theatre Bucharest in Bucharest, Romania.

Productions 
Its first production was The Kalevala, based on the Kalevala, a 19th-century work of Karelian and Finnish epic poetry compiled by Elias Lönnrot, featuring music by Elizabeth Swados.

The Talking Bands productions have evolved over the years, incorporating poetry, dialog, and multi-media elements, alongside music and choreographed movement. The group's pieces have focused on a wide range of subjects ranging from the struggles of being a housewife, to Christianity and nuclear disarmament.

Critics have described the productions as creative and innovative, and American Theatre referred to it as "one of the most exceptional but unsung theatre companies in the country".

Notable productions include:

 The Kalevala (1975)
 Worksong (1977)
 Pedro Paramo (1979)
 Hot Lunch Apostles (1983)
 Betty and the Blenders (1987)
 The Three Lives of Lucie Cabrol (1987)
 No Plays No Poetry (1988)
 Party Time (1996)
 Black Milk Quartet (1998)
 Bitterroot (2001)
 Star Messengers (2000)
 Painted Snake in a Painted Chair (2003)
 Delicious Rivers (2006, co-written with mathematician Marjorie Senechal)
 Panic! Euphoria! Blackout (2010), Imminence (2008)
 The Walk Across America for Mother Earth (2011)

Awards 
The Talking Band is a recipient of fifteen Obie Awards, thirteen of which were awarded for its production of Painted Snake in a Painted Chair.

Company members 
Founding members Maddow, Shepard and Zimet remain as core company members.

Ellen Maddow 
Maddow has written, composed, and performed in most of the group's works. She has written plays including Panic! Euphoria! Blackout, Flip Side, Delicious Rivers, and Painted Snake in a Painted Chair.

Tina Shepard 
Shepard is an actor and teacher at New York University. She has performed in most of the group's productions and has also worked with a number of other companies and artists including Chaikin, Anne Bogart, Target Margin and Buran Theatre. Shows Shepard have contributed to include The Serpent , Terminal, Nightwalk, Electra, The Seagull, Tourists and Refugees, and Trespassing. Shepard has taught acting, directing, voice and movement at Princeton University, Williams College, Smith College and NYU's Experimental Theatre Wing.

Paul Zimet 
Zimet is a writer, director and actor, and serves as the group's artistic director. He has directed over thirty-five original works for the company, of which include New Islands Archipelago, Imminence, Belize, The Parrot, Star Messengers. He received an Obie Award for his direction of Painted Snake in a Painted Chair.

Creative process 
The Talking Band uses a collaborative creative process that incorporates the approaches and aesthetics of artists in a variety of media and arts fields. Throughout the groups history, it has collaborated with artists from multiple fields, including composers Elizabeth Swados, Peter Gordon and "Blue" Gene Tyranny; designers Julie Taymor, Theodora Skipitares, Janie Geiser, and Nic Ularu; writer and performance artist Taylor Mac; and magician Peter Samelson.

The Performance Lab 
In 1996, the group created The Performance Lab, establishing a more formal structure for their collaborative development process. Since 1996, the group has produced seventeen shows through The Performance Lab.

See also 

 Culture of New York City

References

External links 
 

Culture of Manhattan
East Village, Manhattan
Modernist theatre
Obie Award recipients
Off-Off-Broadway
Organizations established in 1974
Theatre companies in New York City